Shinawil (stylised as ShinAwiL) Productions is an Irish television production company. It was founded by producer Larry Bass and director Simon Gibney in 1999. It was acquired by Screentime (branded as Screentime ShinAwiL) as part of a deal to produce an Irish version of Popstars in 2002. In 2015, Screentime sold its 49% stake in Irish production company Shinawil. Productions to date have included Irish versions of international franchises Dragons' Den, Dancing with the Stars and Popstars for RTÉ Television and The Apprentice for TV3.

Filmography

References

External links
 
 
 

Irish companies established in 1999
Television production companies of Ireland
1999 establishments in Ireland
2002 mergers and acquisitions